Sitapur Assembly constituency may refer to 

 Sitapur, Chhattisgarh Assembly constituency
 Sitapur, Uttar Pradesh Assembly constituency